Alan Rosenberg (born October 4, 1950) is an American actor who portrayed the character Eli Levinson in both the series Civil Wars and the popular L.A. Law. From 2005 to 2009, Rosenberg was president of the Screen Actors Guild, the principal motion picture industry on-screen performers' union.

Early life and education
Rosenberg was born on October 4, 1950 and raised in Passaic, New Jersey. He was raised in Conservative Judaism.  Rosenberg's late brother, Mark, was a political activist in the 1960s, later a film producer. Their first cousin, also from Passaic, is musician/songwriter Donald Fagen, co-founder of the group Steely Dan.

Rosenberg's parents gave him money to apply to graduate school. Rosenberg said that upon graduating in 1972 from Case Western Reserve University, he found another passion, poker, and subsequently gambled away most of the money his parents sent him, leaving him only able to afford one application, to the Yale School of Drama. Rosenberg dropped out halfway through his second year at Yale. His "greatest influence and best friend" while there was classmate Meryl Streep.

Career
In 1979, Rosenberg appeared in the movie The Wanderers, as Turkey. He is also well known for his character Ira Woodbine in the sitcom Cybill. More recently, he was seen in the legal drama The Guardian as Alvin Masterson.

Rosenberg supplied the voice of the bounty hunter Boba Fett on NPR's adaptation of The Empire Strikes Back. Rosenberg is also known for his appearance as the crazed "Mad Bomber" in the 1986 cult-classic Stewardess School and Paul Bartel's screwball comedy Not for Publication opposite Nancy Allen (1984).

In 1991, he appeared in the TV film The Boys.

In 1995, he received an Emmy Award nomination for a guest-starring role in the hit drama ER. He starred in the Temptations miniseries in 1998, as long-time manager Shelly Berger.

In 1999, he began a recurring role as the hospital legal counsel, Stuart Brickman, on Chicago Hope. Halfway through their final season, he was added to the opening titles as a series regular.

He appeared on Broadway in What's Wrong With This Picture and Lost In Yonkers, and off-Broadway in Isn't It Romantic, A Prayer for My Daughter, and Kid Champion. He most recently starred at the Delaware Theatre Company production of Partners, written by Allan Katz.

He was elected the 24th president of Screen Actors Guild (SAG) on September 23, 2005. Rosenberg succeeded Melissa Gilbert, who had served as president since 2001 and chose not to run for a third two-year term. Rosenberg received 39.99 percent (10,748 total votes) of the nationwide vote of the Guild's general membership, defeating Morgan Fairchild and Robert Conrad.

In 2005, he appeared as shady defense attorney Adam Novak in an episode of CSI: Crime Scene Investigation co-starring alongside his real-life wife Marg Helgenberger. Novak was portrayed as a womanizer who encountered Catherine (Helgenberger) in a bar and later became the prime suspect in two homicides. In a 2007 episode "Leaving Las Vegas" he appeared as a lawyer defending a client who turned out to be guilty of two separate crimes, and yet the evidence failed to pin him down, resulting in a not guilty verdict which annoyed Catherine so much that she began to undertake further investigation.

In 2006, he appeared in a recurring role as Bruce Steinerman, the divorce attorney of Dr. James Wilson in the television-series House M.D. He has hosted episodes of the public television program, Life: Part 2, which began in 2007 and is produced in St. Paul, Minnesota. The show features panel discussions about issues that baby boomers face as they age.

In 2015, he appeared as Dr. William Golliher in the Amazon original series Bosch. In 2016, he had a recurring role as shady investor William Sutter on the USA Network drama Suits.

From 2016 to 2017, he had a recurring role in the Showtime cable series Shameless (seasons 6 - 8). He portrayed Professor Youens, an alcoholic college professor and mentor to Lip Gallagher.

In 2021 he reappeared in Bosch S07E05 as he was retiring.

Personal life
Rosenberg's first marriage was to actress Robin Bartlett, from 1976 to 1984.

He met Marg Helgenberger in New York City in 1984, while guest-starring on her soap Ryan's Hope. The two became friends and started dating in 1986. They married in 1989 and have one son, Hugh Howard Rosenberg (born October 21, 1990). On December 1, 2008, Rosenberg and Helgenberger announced their separation. On March 25, 2009, Helgenberger filed for divorce. The divorce was finalized in February 2010.

As a result of Helgenberger's mother's 27-year battle with breast cancer, Helgenberger and Rosenberg became involved in the fight against the disease. They have hosted a benefit called Marg and Alan's Celebrity Weekend every year in Omaha, Nebraska since 1999.

Filmography

Film

Television

Video games

Radio

References

External links

 
 

1950 births
American male film actors
Presidents of the Screen Actors Guild
American male television actors
American male voice actors
Case Western Reserve University alumni
Jewish American male actors
Living people
People from Passaic, New Jersey
Male actors from New Jersey
American people of German-Jewish descent
20th-century American male actors
21st-century American male actors
Activists from New Jersey
21st-century American Jews